Robert Weise (2 April 1870, in Stuttgart – 5 November 1923, in Starnberg) was a German painter, of landscapes and portraits, and an illustrator. His works were influenced by French Impressionism.

Biography 

He had originally planned to pursue a career in the military, but was discharged in 1888, due to an illness. In 1889, he transferred to the Kunstakademie Düsseldorf, where he studied with Heinrich Lauenstein, Hugo Crola, Adolf Schill, and Arthur Kampf. During the winter months of 1892 and 1893, he went to Paris, where he attended the Académie Julian. His primary instructors there were Jean-Joseph Benjamin-Constant and William-Adolphe Bouguereau

In 1896, after travelling throughout Belgium, Holland, Italy and Spain, he settled in Munich, where he made friends with the staff members of Jugend, a progressive art magazine. Its founder,  Georg Hirth, was known to be a strong supporter of young artists, and provided them with numerous commissions. In 1899, he was part of a group that established an artists' association called "", an agricultural term that often means "homeland", but they denied any patriotic intent.

After 1900, he spent several months a year in Wartenberg, where he opened a studio with a small house. In 1901, the Munich Secession set up a special exhibition area for the members of Scholle.

That same year, he decided to abandon city life altogether and moved to an area near Lake Constance, with his wife Walburga and daughter Gertraud. For the next five years, they lived in Gottlieben, on the Swiss side of  the Untersee, in a house they rented from an artist named Mathilde von Zúylen-Ammann. Their son Kurt was born there.

In 1906, he received an invitation from the Württembergische Kunstfreunde, offering him his own studio in Stuttgart, with an annual salary, no obligations, and an opportunity to exhibit frequently. He accepted the offer, returned to Stuttgart, and was named a professor in 1911. Three years later, he was appointed to the Grand-Ducal Saxon Art School, Weimar, where he remained during World War I. After the war, he moved to Starnberg, where he died in 1923.

References

Further reading 
 Monika Nebel, Siegfried Unterberger, Felix Billeter and Ute Strimmer (Eds.), "Die Scholle. Eine Künstlergruppe zwischen Secession und Blauer Reiter", In: Chronik der Künstlervereinigung Scholle, 2007. pp. 278–286
 Wilhelm Schäfer, Bildhauer und Maler in den Ländern am Rhein, Düsseldorf, 1913
 Heike Schmidt-Kronseder, Robert Weise. 1870–1823, (exhibition catalog), Strogenhalle, Wartenberg, 2002

External links 

 More works by Weise @ ArtNet
 
 "Robert Weise (1870-1923): Natur und Salon" @ YouTube (in German)

1870 births
1923 deaths
German painters
German landscape painters
German Impressionist painters
Kunstakademie Düsseldorf alumni
Artists from Stuttgart